Constrictive pericarditis is a medical condition characterized by a thickened, fibrotic pericardium, limiting the heart's ability to function normally. In many cases, the condition continues to be difficult to diagnose and therefore benefits from a good understanding of the underlying cause.

Signs and symptoms
Signs and symptoms of constrictive pericarditis are consistent with the following: fatigue, swollen abdomen, difficulty breathing (dyspnea), swelling of legs and general weakness. Related conditions are bacterial pericarditis, pericarditis and pericarditis after a heart attack.

Causes
The cause of constrictive pericarditis in the developing world are idiopathic in origin, though likely infectious in nature.  In regions where tuberculosis is common, it is the cause in a large portion of cases.
Causes of constrictive pericarditis include:
 Tuberculosis
 Incomplete drainage of purulent pericarditis
 Fungal and parasitic infections
 Chronic pericarditis
 Postviral pericarditis
 Postsurgical
 Following MI, post-myocardial infarction
 In association with pulmonary asbestos

Pathophysiology 

The pathophysiological characteristics of constrictive pericarditis are due to a thickened, fibrotic pericardium that forms a non-compliant shell around the heart.  This shell prevents the heart from expanding when blood enters it. As pressure on the heart increases, the stroke volume decreases as a result of a reduction in the diastolic expansion in the chambers.  This results in significant respiratory variation in blood flow in the chambers of the heart.

During inspiration, pressure in the thoracic cavity decreases but is not relayed to the left atrium, subsequently a reduction in flow to the left atrium and ventricle happens. During diastole, less blood flow in left ventricle allows for more room for filling in right ventricle and therefore a septal shift occurs.

During expiration, the amount of blood entering the left ventricle will increase, allowing the interventricular septum to bulge towards the right ventricle, decreasing the right heart ventricular filing.

Diagnosis 

The diagnosis of constrictive pericarditis is often difficult to make.  In particular, restrictive cardiomyopathy has many similar clinical features to constrictive pericarditis, and differentiating them in a particular individual is often a diagnostic dilemma.
 Chest X-Ray - pericardial calcification (common but not specific), pleural effusions are common findings.
 Echocardiography - the principal echographic finding is changes in cardiac chamber volume.
 CT and MRI - CT scan is useful in assessing the thickness of pericardium, calcification, and ventricular contour. Cardiac MRI may find pericardial thickening and pericardial-myocardial adherence. Ventricular septum shift during breathing can also be found using cardiac MRI. Late gadolinium enhancement can show enhancement of the pericardium due to fibroblast proliferation and neovascularization.
 BNP blood test -  tests for the existence of the cardiac hormone brain natriuretic peptide, which is only present in restrictive cardiomyopathy but not in constrictive pericarditis
 Conventional cardiac catheterization
 Physical examination - can reveal clinical features including Kussmaul's sign and a pericardial knock.

Treatment 
The definitive treatment for constrictive pericarditis is pericardial stripping, which is a surgical procedure where the entire pericardium is peeled away from the heart.  This procedure has significant risk involved, with mortality rates of 6% or higher in major referral centers.

A poor outcome is almost always the result after a pericardiectomy is performed for constrictive pericarditis whose origin was radiation-induced, further some patients may develop heart failure post-operatively.

References

Further reading

External links 

Disorders of fascia
Inflammations
Pericardial disorders

ja:心膜炎#慢性収縮性心膜炎